Boniface Abel Sikowo (born 27 July 1999) is a Ugandan track and field athlete who specializes in the 3000 metres steeplechase. In 2019, he competed in the men's 3000 metres steeplechase at the 2019 World Athletics Championships held in Doha, Qatar. He did not qualify to compete in the final.

In 2017, he competed in the men's 3000 metres steeplechase at the 2017 World Athletics Championships held in London, United Kingdom.

In 2019, he represented Uganda at the 2019 African Games held in Rabat, Morocco. He competed in the men's 3000 metres steeplechase and he finished in 5th place.

References

External links 
 

Living people
1999 births
Place of birth missing (living people)
Ugandan male steeplechase runners
World Athletics Championships athletes for Uganda
Athletes (track and field) at the 2019 African Games
African Games competitors for Uganda
20th-century Ugandan people
21st-century Ugandan people